Chitan may refer to:
 Chitan, Kurdistan (چيتان - Chitān)
 Chitan, Mazandaran (چيتن - Chitan)
Chitan devil in Arabic Darija